A pyrrhic is a metrical foot used in formal poetry.

Pyrrhic may also refer to:
 Senses qualifying uses of "victory":
 Pyrrhic victory, a victory at devastating cost
 Pyrrhic Victory (album), 2006 album by Intwine
 Pyrrhic Victories, a short story by Mathilda Malling
Pyrrhic dance, a coming of age ritual for Korybantes warriors in Ancient Greece
Pyrrhichios, an ancient Greek dance described by Xenophon
Pyrrhic defeat theory, a theory in criminology
Pyrrhic War (280–275 BC), a series of battles among the Greeks

See also
Pyrrhus (disambiguation)
Pyrrha (disambiguation)
Pyrrhias (disambiguation)